Jubilee is a 2019 cookbook by American cook and writer Toni Tipton-Martin.

References 

2019 non-fiction books
Cookbooks
English-language books